Josef Věntus (17 February 1931 – 29 December 2001) was a Czech rower who competed for Czechoslovakia in the 1956 Summer Olympics, in the 1960 Summer Olympics, and in the 1964 Summer Olympics.

Life
Věntus was born in Kylešovice part of Opava on 17 February 1931. In 1956 he was a crew member of the Czechoslovak boat which was eliminated in the semi-finals of the eight event. Four years later he won the bronze medal with the Czechoslovak boat in the eights competition. At the 1964 Games, he won his second bronze medal as part of the Czechoslovak boat in the eights event.

Věntus died in Prague on 29 December 2001, at the age of 70.

References

1931 births
2001 deaths
Czech male rowers
Czechoslovak male rowers
Olympic rowers of Czechoslovakia
Rowers at the 1956 Summer Olympics
Rowers at the 1960 Summer Olympics
Rowers at the 1964 Summer Olympics
Olympic bronze medalists for Czechoslovakia
Olympic medalists in rowing
Medalists at the 1964 Summer Olympics
Medalists at the 1960 Summer Olympics
Sportspeople from Opava
European Rowing Championships medalists